The 2004 Allianz Suisse Open Gstaad was a tennis tournament played on outdoor clay courts at the Roy Emerson Arena in Gstaad in Switzerland and was part of the International Series of the 2004 ATP Tour. The tournament ran from July 5 through July 11, 2004.

Finals

Singles

 Roger Federer defeated  Igor Andreev 6–2, 6–3, 5–7, 6–3
 It was Federer's 7th title of the year and the 18th of his career.

Doubles

 Leander Paes /  David Rikl defeated  Marc Rosset /  Stanislas Wawrinka 6–4, 6–2
 It was Paes' 2nd title of the year and the 29th of his career. It was Rikl's 2nd title of the year and the 30th of his career.

External links
 Official website 
 ATP tournament profile

Allianz Suisse Open Gstaad
Swiss Open (tennis)
2004 Allianz Suisse Open Gstaad